Phytolopsis is a genus of snakes belonging to the family Homalopsidae.

The species of this genus are found in Southeastern Asia.

Species
Species:
 Phytolopsis punctata Gray, 1849

References

Homalopsidae
Snake genera